The 19035/36 Vadodara - Ahmedabad Intercity Express is an express train belonging to Indian Railways that run between  and  in India. It is currently being operated with 19035/19036 train numbers on daily basis,

Service 

Routeing

Gallery

Coaches

The train consists of 21 coaches:

 3 AC Chair Car 
 16 General Unreserved
 2 Seating cum Luggage Rake

As with most train services in India, Coach Composition may be amended at the discretion of Indian Railways depending on demand.

Traction

As this route is fully electrified, a  based WAP-5 hauls the train for its entire journey.

References

External links
19035 Intercity Express at India Rail Info
19036 Intercity Express at India Rail Info

Transport in Vadodara
Transport in Ahmedabad
Rail transport in Gujarat
Intercity Express (Indian Railways) trains